Wave To Make Friends is the first full-length album from American indie rock band The Comas.

Track listing
Tears For Trixie  
Sparrowheaded Man
16mm
Fainter
B To Chloe
Victoria
Execution Style
Naked Cowboys
Broken Camel

References

External links
TheComas.com (Official site)

1999 debut albums
The Comas albums